Senao International, Co., Ltd. is a Taiwanese distributor of cellular phones, smartphones, tablets, notebooks, game consoles and related accessories. Founded in 1979, it is a public company listed on the Taiwan Stock Exchange and a subsidiary of Chunghwa Telecom, the incumbent mobile, PSTN, and broadband carrier of Taiwan. Senao International is the largest cellular phone distributor in Taiwan with over 50% market share.

In 2006, the wireless product group that manufactures data networking products and wireless telephones under the EnGenius and Senao brand names was spun off from Senao International to become Senao Networks, Inc.

See also
 List of companies of Taiwan

External links

References 

1979 establishments in Taiwan
Telecommunications companies established in 1979
Telecommunications companies of Taiwan